Tibor Molnár (born 12 May 1993) is a Hungarian professional footballer who plays for Budaörsi SC.

Club statistics

Updated to games played as of 13 November 2013.

References
MLSZ 

1993 births
Sportspeople from Székesfehérvár
Living people
Hungarian footballers
Association football forwards
FC Felcsút players
Fehérvár FC players
Puskás Akadémia FC players
Csákvári TK players
FC Ajka players
Budaörsi SC footballers
Nemzeti Bajnokság I players
Nemzeti Bajnokság II players
Hungarian expatriate footballers
Expatriate footballers in Italy
Hungarian expatriate sportspeople in Italy